Ho Mei-yueh (born 9 January 1951) is a Taiwanese politician.

Education
Ho studied agricultural chemistry at National Taiwan University and technology management and business administration at National Chengchi University.

Political career
Ho joined the Ministry of Economic Affairs in 1975 by becoming a technician at the Industrial Development Bureau, in which she was promoted as the deputy director-general of the bureau in 1994. She was named the economics minister in 2004 and served until 2006. She then led the Council for Economic Planning and Development from 2007 to 2008. Tsai Ing-wen offered Ho the opportunity to return as economics minister in 2016, but she did not accept, leading the Tsai administration to select Chih-Kung Lee instead.

In 2021, Ho received Japan's Order of the Rising Sun, Gold and Silver Star, for her contributions to "facilitating exchanges between Taiwan and Japan in the areas of economics and science and technology.".

References

External links
Ho on women and leadership

1956 births
Living people
Academic staff of the National Taiwan University
Taiwanese Ministers of Economic Affairs
National Chengchi University alumni
National Taiwan University alumni
Women government ministers of Taiwan
Recipients of the Order of the Rising Sun, 2nd class